Gymneia is a genus of flowering plants belonging to the family Lamiaceae.

Its native range is Brazil to Bolivia.

Species:

Gymneia ampelophylla 
Gymneia chapadensis 
Gymneia interrupta 
Gymneia malacophylla 
Gymneia moniliformis 
Gymneia platanifolia 
Gymneia virgata

References

Lamiaceae
Lamiaceae genera